Little Lorestan, also known as Lor-e Kuchek and Lor-e Feyli, was a region in Iran which roughly corresponded to the present-day Ilam and Lorestan provinces. From the 16th-century and onwards, it was also referred to as Lorestan. In the 19th-century, the area was split into Ilam and Lorestan.

References

Sources 
 
 

Lorestan Province
Historical regions of Iran